The flag of Bahia is one of the official symbols of the state of Bahia, Brazil. The current flag was introduced on June 11, 1960.

History 
The Bahian physician, Dr. Deocleciano Ramos, presented the flag while serving as a representative during a meeting of the Republican Party in Salvador on May 25, 1889. The flag was adopted as the party's flag the following day.

The flag is strongly influenced by the Flag of the United States, along with a triangle evocative of Freemasonry, which was already adopted during the unsuccessful 1789 separatist movement of Inconfidência Mineira. The colors red, white, and blue had also appeared during the 1798 Bahian slave rebellion of the Revolt of the Tailors, also known as the Bahian Conspiracy and lately the Revolt of Buzios.

The flag was officially adopted by governor Juracy Magalhães (pt), with Decree No. 17628 of June 11, 1960.

References

Flags of Brazil
Flags introduced in 1960
1960 establishments in Brazil
Bahia